Ghatampur Lok Sabha Constituency was one of the 80 parliamentary constituencies of Uttar Pradesh till 2008.

Assembly Segments

Members of Parliament

Election results

See also
 Akbarpur Lok Sabha constituency
 Kannauj Lok Sabha constituency
 Etawah Lok Sabha constituency
 Jalaun Lok Sabha constituency
 Fatehpur Lok Sabha constituency
 Ghatampur
 List of Constituencies of the Lok Sabha

Kanpur Nagar district
Former Lok Sabha constituencies of Uttar Pradesh
2008 disestablishments in India
Constituencies disestablished in 2008
Former constituencies of the Lok Sabha